Skogadalsbøen is a cabin in Luster in Sogn og Fjordane, Norway, in the western part of Jotunheimen, owned by the Norwegian Trekking Association (DNT). The cabin lies 834 metres above sea level, in the valley Utladalen. The site was originally the location of several summer mountain farms. The tourist cabin was built in 1888 and originally had 12 beds; today there are 109 beds.

References

Bibliography
 

Tourist huts in Norway
Jotunheimen
Residential buildings completed in 1888